Bucovăț is a town in Strășeni District, Moldova.

Bucovăț may also refer to the following entities in Romania

Bucovăț, Dolj, a commune in Dolj County
Bucovăț, Timiș, a commune in Timiș County
Bucovăț, a village in Dumbrava Commune, Timiș County
Bucovăț, a tributary of the Moldova in Suceava County

See also 
 Bukovina (disambiguation)
 Bukovec (disambiguation)
 Bukovac (disambiguation)